P is the debut and only album by American alternative rock band P, featuring Bill Carter, Johnny Depp, Gibby Haynes and Sal Jenco. It was released on November 21, 1995 through  Capitol Records and was reissued on May 8, 2007, under the Caroline Records label. Produced by bassist Andrew Weiss, the album also featured contributions from Red Hot Chili Peppers bassist Flea, Sex Pistols guitarist Steve Jones, and pianist and Los Angeles scene fixture Chuck E. Weiss.

The album features a diverse "array of alternative rock, touching on funk metal, R.E.M.-style folk-rock, and grunge." The album also features cover versions of Daniel Johnston's "I Save Cigarette Butts" and ABBA's "Dancing Queen". The track "Michael Stipe", named after the R.E.M. frontman, was released as a single in 1995 and received airplay on alternative radio.

Critical reception

CD Review magazine panned the album, stating, "Though the group aims to be something other than a Gen X conversation piece, much of this debut is pointless dross." In Q, David Quantick awarded the album one out of five stars. He wrote, "Records made by actors are dreadful (there are no exceptions)... The result makes the phrase 'self-indulgence' seem puny and not up to the job." Sandy Masuo of the Los Angeles Times gave the album three out of four stars, describing it as "a surreal blend of rough-hewn rock, Gothic Western twang and psychedelic dub."

In a retrospective review, AllMusic senior editor Stephen Thomas Erlewine noted the band's eclectic musical style. He stated: "While they are musically proficient, some of their songs aren't quite up to par. Nevertheless, their debut album is a surprisingly enjoyable effort."

Track listing

Personnel
P
 Bill Carter – guitar, bass
 Johnny Depp – guitar, bass
 Gibby Haynes – vocals, artwork
 Sal Jenco – percussion

Additional musicians
 Ruth Ellsworth-Carter – keyboards
 Flea – bass
 Steve Jones – guitar
 Chuck E. Weiss – washboard

Technical personnel
 Andrew Weiss – production, bass, mellotron, Moog, guitar
 Tim Devine – A&R 
 Tommy Steele – art direction
 Wendy Dougan – art direction, design
 Christina Bookman – artwork (print production)
 Richard Huredia – additional engineering
 Tom Bunch – management

References

External links
 

1995 debut albums
P (band) albums
Capitol Records albums
Caroline Records albums